The 2020–21 Western Carolina Catamounts men's basketball team represented Western Carolina University in the 2020–21 NCAA Division I men's basketball season. The Catamounts, led by third-year head coach Mark Prosser, played their home games at the Ramsey Center in Cullowhee, North Carolina, as members of the Southern Conference. They finished 11–16, 4–13 in Southern Conference play to finish in ninth place. They were defeated by The Citadel in the first round of the Southern Conference tournament.

Previous season

The Catamounts finished the 2019–20 season 19–12, 10–8 in Southern Conference play to finish in a tie for fifth place. They defeated Mercer in the quarterfinals of the Southern Conference tournament before losing in the semifinals to East Tennessee State.

Offseason

Player departures

Incoming transfers

Recruiting Class of 2020

Roster

Schedule and results

|-
!colspan=12 style=| Non-conference Regular season

|-
!colspan=12 style=| SoCon Regular season

|-
!colspan=12 style=| SoCon tournament
|-

|-

Source

References

Western Carolina Catamounts men's basketball seasons
Western Carolina Catamounts
Western Carolina Catamounts men's basketball
Western Carolina Catamounts men's basketball